Americans at the Black Sea is a 2007 Turkish comedy film, directed by Kartal Tibet, about a U.S. military recovery operation on Turkey's Black Sea coast.

Plot 
A rocket the United States has located on the Black Sea's seabed as a precaution against a potential threat from Tehran launches accidentally. Officers, quickly realizing the incident, alter the coordinates of the rocket and manage to land it—without exploding—on Turkey's Black Sea coast. All that's left is to retrieve the rocket from the village before anybody notices.

See also 
Stereotypes of Americans

References

External links
 

2007 comedy films
2007 films
Films set in Turkey
Turkish comedy films